Ellis Raymond Jones (born 4 December 2003) is an English footballer who plays as a midfielder. He began his career at Port Vale and played on loan at Newcastle Town.

Career
Jones made his first-team debut for Port Vale at the age of 17 whilst still a second-year youth scholar, coming on as a half-time substitute for Brad Walker in a 1–0 win over Rochdale in an EFL Trophy group stage game at Vale Park on 5 October 2021. Manager Darrell Clarke said that he had done well in the game and that "he earned it [his debut], I don’t give them out for the sake of it. Some clubs do but I don’t agree with that". He was then played in central defence by youth-team coach Billy Paynter "to help him develop with more time on the ball", and was also given the captain's armband in youth-team games. On 19 March 2022, Jones joined Northern Premier League Division One West side Newcastle Town on loan. He played a total of five games for Newcastle. He was not offered a professional contract when his youth-team contract expired in June 2022.

Style of play
Jones is a central midfielder, though can also play at centre-back.

Career statistics

References

2003 births
Living people
Sportspeople from Wednesbury
English footballers
Association football midfielders
Association football defenders
Port Vale F.C. players
Newcastle Town F.C. players
English Football League players
Northern Premier League players